Graphiopsis is a genus of fungi belonging to the family Davidiellaceae.

The species of this genus are found in Europe, Japan, Northern America and New Zealand.

Species:
 Graphiopsis ceratostomoides 
 Graphiopsis chlorocephala 
 Graphiopsis desmazieri 
 Graphiopsis sacchari 
 Graphiopsis verticillata

References

Fungi